Nicholas Roland Leybourne "Fink" Haysom (born 21 April 1952) is a South African lawyer and diplomat who focuses on democratic governance, constitutional and electoral reforms and the reconciliation and peace process. Since 2021, he has been serving as the Special Representative of the United Nations Secretary-General and Head of the United Nations Mission in South Sudan (UNMISS).

Early life and education
Haysom was schooled at Michaelhouse in Natal, South Africa. Subsequently, he earned a degree in law from the University of Natal and the University of Cape Town, where was president of the Students Representative Council. In 2012, he also received an honorary Doctor of Law degree from the University of Cape Town.

In 1976 Haysom became president of the National Union of South African Students (NUSAS) at a time when the anti-apartheid student organization was in disarray following the arrest of many of its leaders. He was jailed four times by the regime, including periods where he was kept in solitary confinement.

Career
Haysom served as an associate professor of law and deputy director at the Centre for Applied Legal Studies (CALS) at the University of the Witwatersrand (Wits University, Wits) until May 1994.

In 1979, Haysom joined fellow Wits academics Halton Cheadle and Clive Thompson to become the founding partners of the human rights law firm of Cheadle Thompson & Haysom Attorneys in Johannesburg. He served as a senior lawyer with the practice and litigated high-profile human rights cases as an attorney of the High Court of South Africa during 1981 to 1993.

United Nations 
Haysom has held high-level positions within both the United Nations and the Government of South Africa. During the period of 1999 to 2002, Haysom was involved in the Burundi peace talks and held the position as chair of the committee negotiating constitutional issues. Prior to joining the United Nations in 2005, he held the position of principal adviser to the mediator in the Sudanese Peace Process and as chief legal and constitutional adviser in the office of South African President Nelson Mandela. From 2005 to 2007, Haysom held the position of head of the Office of Constitutional Support for the United Nations Assistance Mission for Iraq (UNAMI). From 2007 to 2012, he held the position of director for Political, Peacekeeping and Humanitarian Affairs in the Executive Office of United Nations Secretary-General Ban Ki-moon.

In 2012, Haysom was appointed by Ban as Deputy Special Representative of the Secretary General for the United Nations Assistance Mission in Afghanistan (UNAMA) and in 2014 he was appointed as Special Representative of the mission. Succeeding Haile Menkerios, he was appointed as Special Envoy for Sudan and South Sudan in March 2016.

In 2018, United Nations Secretary-General António Guterres appointed Haysom as his Special Representative for Somalia and Head of the United Nations Assistance Mission in Somalia (UNSOM). After only four months, he was expelled from the country on 1 January 2019 by the Somali government under the administration of Muhamed Abdullahi which claimed that he had threatened the sovereignty of the country after questioning the legal basis of the arrest of Mukhtar Robow. The United Nations Security Council expressed regret at Somalia’s decision to expel a U.N. envoy who questioned the arrest of an extremist group defector-turned-political candidate.

After leaving his position, Haysom served as the Secretary-General’s Special Adviser on Sudan during 2019 to 2020 and on Southern Africa during 2020 to 2021. On 15 January 2021, the United Nations Secretary-General António Guterres announced Haysom's appointment as his Special Representative and Head of the United Nations Mission in South Sudan (UNMISS).

Recognition 
Haysom received an honorary Doctor of Laws degree from New York Law School in 2019.

Works

References

External links
 

1952 births
Living people
People from Durban
Scholars of constitutional law
South African diplomats
20th-century South African lawyers
South African legal scholars
South African officials of the United Nations
Special Envoys of the Secretary-General of the United Nations
Special Representatives of the Secretary-General of the United Nations
United Nations operations in Iraq
United Nations operations in Sudan
University of Cape Town alumni
University of Natal alumni
Academic staff of the University of the Witwatersrand
White South African anti-apartheid activists
Alumni of Michaelhouse